Anupalem is a village situated in Guntur district, Andhra Pradesh, India, and located near Piduguralla and Sattenapalli.

References 

Villages in Guntur district